Kadriorg (Estonian for "Catherine's Valley") is a subdistrict in the district of Kesklinn ("Midtown"), Tallinn, the capital of Estonia. It has a population of 4,561. The subdistrict name derives from the Catherinethal, a Baroque palace of Catherine I of Russia. It is one of the wealthiest neighbourhoods in Estonia. 

Kadriorg is known for the Kadriorg palace and the surrounding park, commissioned by the Russian Czar Peter the Great. Nowadays the park is a location of several museums including the Kadriorg Art Museum (a branch of the Art Museum of Estonia in Kadriorg palace), Kumu Art Museum, Mikkel, Peter the Great Museum and Eduard Vilde Museum. Nearby, close to the sea, is the Russalka Memorial which commemorates the loss of a Russian warship in 1893.

The official residence of the President of Estonia is situated next to Kadriorg Palace in the park.

Gallery

References

External links
Kadriorg Art Museum
Kadriorg Park 
Kadriorg virtual tour

Subdistricts of Tallinn
Kesklinn, Tallinn